Maarja Kangro (born 20 December 1973 in Tallinn) is an Estonian poet, short story writer, novelist, essayist, nonfiction writer and librettist.

Life
She is the daughter of composer Raimo Kangro and author Leelo Tungal. She studied English at the University of Tartu and is currently a PhD student in cultural studies at the University of Tallinn. She has written several libretti for Estonian composers and has translated from Italian, English, German, and other languages (among others Giacomo Leopardi, Andrea Zanzotto, Valerio Magrelli, Giorgio Agamben, Hans Magnus Enzensberger).

Selected works

Books
 2006 Kurat õrnal lumel (poems)
 2006 Puuviljadraakon (children’s book)
 2007 Tule mu koopasse, mateeria (poems)
 2008 Heureka (poems)
 2010 Ahvid ja solidaarsus (short stories)
 2010 Kunstiteadlase jõulupuu (poems)
 2012 Dantelik auk (short stories)
 2013 Must tomat (poems)
 2014 Hüppa tulle (short stories and a novella)
 2016 Klaaslaps (novel)
 2018 Minu auhinnad (nonfiction)
 2019 Tuul (poetry)
 2019 Varietee (selected poetry translations)
 2020 Kaks pead (collection of libretti with an afterword)
 2020 Isa kõrvad (stories for children)

Books in translation
 2011 La farfalla dell'irreversibilità (poems in Italian)
 2012 Обезьяны и солидарность (short stories in Russian)
 2013 Чёрный помидор (poetry in Russian)
 2018 Stikla bērns (novel in Latvian)
 2018 Kind aus Glas (novel in German)
 2019 Фруктовый дракон (children's book in Russian)
 2020 Stiklo vaikas (novel in Lithuanian)

Libretti and other texts for music
 1999 Süda, an opera by Raimo Kangro (with Kirke Kangro)
 2005 Kaubamaja, an opera by Tõnis Kaumann 
 2006 Tuleaed and Mu luiged, mu mõtted, operas by Tõnu Kõrvits 
 2007 To Define Happiness, a multimedia work by Gavin Bryars and Peeter Jalakas
 2008 Monument Muneja-Kukele ehk Kuked ja kanad, a cantata by Timo Steiner
 2009 Tartumaa täditütar, an opera by Tõnis Kaumann
 2011 Kaks pead, an opera by Timo Steiner

Awards
 2006 Estonian Children’s Literature Centre’s Best Book of the Year Award (for Puuviljadraakon)
 2008 Tallinn University Literary Award (for Tule mu koopasse, mateeria)
 2009 Tallinn University Literary Award (for Heureka)
 2009 Estonian Cultural Endowment’s Literary Award for poetry :et:Kultuurkapitali kirjanduse sihtkapitali aastapreemia (for Heureka)
 2011 Estonian Cultural Endowment’s Literary Award for prose :et:Kultuurkapitali kirjanduse sihtkapitali aastapreemia (for Ahvid ja solidaarsus)
 2011 Friedebert Tuglas Short Story Award (for 48 tundi)
 2014 Friedebert Tuglas Short Story Award (for Atropose Opel Meriva)
 2016 Tallinn University Literary Award for translation (Hans Magnus Enzensberger's "Der Untergang der Titanic")
 2016 Erster Rödermarkscher Literaturpreis (for the poem "Der Ex" / "Vana armuke")
 2020 Tallinn University Literary Award for Poetry and Translation (for "Tuul" and "Varietee")

References

External links
 Biography Estonian Literature Information Centre
Interview in Estonian Literary Magazine
 Poems in English Estonian Literary Magazine | Poetry by Maarja Kangro
 Interview in English Maintenant #84 - Maarja Kangro -
 Poems in several languages (Lyrikline) Home · Lyrikline.org

1973 births
Living people
21st-century Estonian poets
Estonian women short story writers
20th-century Estonian women writers
Estonian women poets
Writers from Tallinn
University of Tartu alumni
Tallinn University alumni
Women librettists
21st-century Estonian women writers
20th-century short story writers
21st-century short story writers